Rajendra Prasad is a cinematographer, writer, producer and director known for his works in Indian cinema. An alumnus of the Film and Television Institute of India, he made films across various Indian languages and Persian. Prasad is a Science graduate from Osmania University and graduate in Law from the University of Mumbai. In 1995 he founded his own production company, "Amateur Artists"  and produced, directed:

All lights, no stars (2016, English),

Residue-where the truth lies (2005, English),

Man, woman and the mouse (2000, English),

Nirantaram (1995, Telugu) 

He is the writer and cinematographer of all the films he makes.

Filmography
 Nirantharam (1995) – Writer, cinematographer, director, producer 
 Man, Woman and the Mouse (2000) – Writer, cinematographer, director, producer  
 Inscrutable Americans (2001) – Director of Photography
 Patth (2003) – Director of Photography
 Girlfriend (2004 film) (2004) – Director of photography
 Hawas (2004) – Director of photography
  Megham in telugu (2004) – Director of photography
 Residue - Where the Truth Lies (2005) – Writer, cinematographer, director, producer 
 Eight: The Power of Shani (2006) – Director of photography
 Saawan... The Love Season (2006) – Director of photography
 Game (2007) – Director of photography
 Mittal v/s Mittal (2010) – Director of photography
 Aagaah: The Warning  (2011) - Director of photography
 Sisira in Telugu – Director of photography
 Hero in Telugu – Director of photography
 Divana-e-Ishq in Persian (2013) – Director of photography        
All Lights, No Stars (2016) – Writer, cinematographer, director, producer
 Call for Fun (2017) – Director of photography

References

External links
 

1966 births
Living people
Film and Television Institute of India alumni
Indian cinematographers
Indian film directors
Indian film producers
Indian male screenwriters
Osmania University alumni
University of Mumbai alumni